Katie Roche is a 1936 expressionist play by Irish playwright Teresa Deevy. It has been staged by the Abbey Theatre eleven times with the most recent revival being in 2017.

Described as a "reputed favourite with amateur dramatic societies and theatre groups" the play has been staged by a broad range of companies, notable amongst these are productions by Radio Éireann, Lennox Robinson in the Torch Theatre and New York's Mint Theater Company.

References

External links
 

1936 plays
Plays by Teresa Deevy
Plays set in Ireland
Expressionist plays